This list of Indianapolis neighborhoods provides a general overview of neighborhoods, districts, and subdivisions located in the city of Indianapolis, Indiana, United States. Nine townships form the broadest geographic divisions within Marion County and Indianapolis. For statistical purposes, the consolidated city-county is organized into 99 smaller "neighborhood areas," some of which overlap township boundaries. Most neighborhood areas contain numerous individual districts, subdivisions, and some semi-autonomous towns. In total, some 500 self-identified neighborhood associations are registered in the City’s Registered Community Organization system.

Typical of American cities in the Midwest, Indianapolis urbanized in the late-19th and early-20th centuries, resulting in the development of relatively dense, well-defined neighborhoods clustered around streetcar corridors, especially in Center Township. The economic attainability of private automobiles influenced the city's development patterns through the mid-20th century. As a result, Indianapolis has a unique urban-to-rural transect, ranging from dense urban neighborhoods, to suburban tract housing subdivisions, to rural villages.

History

Annexations

Since its founding in 1821, Indianapolis' outward development was measured, with few annexations. By 1891, revisions to the city charter incorporated provisions that strengthened the city's annexation powers. The controversial provision was mired in litigation until 1895 when the Indiana General Assembly effectively endorsed the city's position by state statute. In 1897, Indianapolis responded with the annexation of five suburbs: Brightwood, Haughville, Mount Jackson, North Indianapolis, and West Indianapolis.

The expansion of the city's streetcar and interurban systems at the turn of the 20th century allowed workers to live further from the economic center of Indianapolis, establishing streetcar suburbs on the city's periphery. These included towns as far east as Irvington (annexed in 1902) and as far south as University Heights (annexed in 1923). The town of Broad Ripple, which had itself absorbed neighboring Wellington in 1884, was annexed into the city of Indianapolis in 1922. By the end of the 1950s, the city had appointed an annexation director and completed several major annexations adding 28,000 residents. Woodruff Place was annexed in 1962.

Unigov

On January 1, 1970, the city-county consolidation of Indianapolis and Marion County (Unigov) resulted in the partial annexation of 16 towns, known as "included towns". Under state statute, included towns retain some limited autonomy; however, they are legally considered part of the Consolidated City of Indianapolis and Marion County, subject to its laws and government. , eleven towns retain their status as "included towns," while five have fully dissolved: Highwoods, Lynhurst (1988), Ravenswood (1989), Shore Acres (1991), and Castleton (1992). Of the dissolved towns, Castleton and Ravenswood have retained some local identity, as evidenced by the continued use of those names for two of Indianapolis' official neighborhood areas.

By default, several unincorporated communities in outlying townships were absorbed into Indianapolis as a result of Unigov. Most had been established in the 19th century as rural outposts or early railroad stations. These included Valley Mills and West Newton in Decatur Township; Acton, Five Points, and Wanamaker in Franklin Township; Edgewood in Perry Township; Augusta in Pike Township; Julietta in Warren Township; Allisonville in Washington Township; and Ben Davis, Bridgeport, and Maywood in Wayne Township. Many of these unincorporated places have retained the appearance of rural villages well into the 21st century and continue to be referenced by their bygone names, as evidenced by several designated neighborhood areas that have appropriated names based on relative geography.

List of neighborhoods

See also
 Indianapolis Cultural Districts
 Unigov

Notes

References

External links

 Geographic Names Information System (GNIS), developed by the U.S. Geological Survey (USGS), a bureau of the U.S. Department of the Interior.
 Conservation Districts. Indianapolis Historic Preservation Commission (IHPC) and the Metropolitan Development Commission (MDC).
 Map of Marion County Neighborhoods

 
Indianapolis